Wila Quta (Aymara wila blood, blood-red, quta lake, "red lake", also spelled Huilacota) is a mountain in the Wansu mountain range in the Andes of Peru, about  high. It is situated in the Apurímac Region, Antabamba Province, Antabamba District, and in the Arequipa Region, La Unión Province, Huaynacotas District. Wila Quta lies west of Taruja Marka and Allqa Walusa and southeast of Wallqa Wallqa.

References 

Mountains of Peru
Mountains of Apurímac Region
Mountains of Arequipa Region